Martina Hingis and Anna Kournikova were the defending champions but Hingis did not compete this year. Kournikova partnered Natasha Zvereva and reached the quarterfinals where they were beaten by Els Callens and Dominique Van Roost.

Ai Sugiyama and Nathalie Tauziat won the title, beating Lisa Raymond and Rennae Stubbs in the final, 2–6, 6–3, 7–6(7–3).

Seeds
Champion seeds are indicated in bold text while text in italics indicates the round in which those seeds were eliminated.

 Lisa Raymond /  Rennae Stubbs (final)
 Lindsay Davenport /  Corina Morariu (first round)
 Anna Kournikova /  Natasha Zvereva (quarterfinals)
 Ai Sugiyama /  Nathalie Tauziat (champions)

Draw

External links
2000 Direct Line International Championships Doubles Draw

Britannic Asset Management International Championships
Doubles